Shizu Station is the name of two train stations in Japan:

Shizu Station (Chiba) (志津駅)
 Shizu Station (Ibaraki) (静駅)